The 2017 NRL season is the 110th season of professional rugby league in Australia and the 20th season run by the National Rugby League. The season started in with the annual Auckland Nines, and was followed by the All Stars Match. Round 1 commenced on 2 March with 2016 premiers Cronulla-Sutherland Sharks playing Brisbane Broncos.

Venues 
All matches will be hosted across 26 different venues in both Australia and New Zealand.

Australian venues

New Zealand venues

Round 1

Total Points Scored: 332

Round 2

Total Points Scored: 391

Round 3

Total Points Scored: 286

Round 4

Total Points Scored: 285

Round 5

Total Points Scored: 276

Round 6

Total Points Scored: 305
The Melbourne Storm were kept tryless against the Cronulla Sharks for the first time in Melbourne.

Round 7

The Parramatta Eels overcame a 12-point deficit with 10 minutes left to defeat Wests Tigers 26–22 breaking a 4-game losing streak.

Round 8-ANZAC Round

Round 9

Round 10

Melbourne's 36 points equalled the first grade record for highest losing scores

The Melbourne v Gold Coast and Manly v Brisbane games were played as a double header.

Round 11-Beanies for Brain Cancer Round

Round 12

Round 13

Round 14

After being down 20–12 with less than 2mins left, the Panthers scored and converted 2 tries to steal a victory from the Canberra Raiders.

Round 15

Round 16

Round 17

The Cronulla Sharks were the first team in 2017 to have a perfect completion rate at half-time with 19/19 against the Sydney Roosters.

Round 18

The Bulldogs scored 12 points in 5 minutes to comeback from an 8-18 deficit after 75mins.

Round 19

Mt Smart Stadium was renamed Manu Vatuvei Stadium for the weekend in honour of retiring player Manu Vatuvei.

Round 20-Women in League Round

Round 21

Round 22-Retro Round

The Knights won back to back games for the first time since 2015 while their opponents, the New Zealand Warriors, lost 5 games in a row for the first time since 2015.
The Penrith Vs Wests match marked the 300th match that Gavin Badger refereed becoming only the fifth NRL referee to reach this milestone. 
Also the Penrith Vs Wests tigers match was the first match since early in the 1990s where a father (Ivan Cleary) coached up against his son (Nathan).

Round 23

The Knights won their first away game since Round 24, 2015.

Round 24

Round 25

Round 26

Ladder 

 Teams highlighted in green have qualified for the finals
 The team highlighted in blue has clinched the minor premiership
 The team highlighted in red has clinched the wooden spoon

Finals Series

References

Results